Soundararaja is an Indian actor and film Producer who appears in South Indian Films. Following a stint as a system engineer had worked in Singapore and France he began considering acting as career. He was working as a background actor, playing minor supporting roles for over five years; he started his career as villain role in S. R. Prabakaran in Sundarapandian (2012) and Jigarthanda (2014), in between he did many roles in various projects again in 2016 he acted as Villain again in Dharma Durai (2016) with Vijay Sethupathi. In the same year, 2016 he got introduced as a Hero in Enakku Veru Engum Kilaigal Kidayathu (2016), with Goundamani,  which was a reasonable hit in Goundamani & Soundararaja's career.

Also Soundararaja is a nature and environment lover. He started Mannukkum Makkalukkum Social Welfare Trust with his friends and family, since 11 August 2017. Along with the trust people he had planted more than twenty five thousand plants all over Tamilnadu. Soundararaja is a social activist. He had participated in many key social affairs across Tamilnadu. The most mentionable was his involvement in 2017 pro-jallikattu protests. He was one of the representative of Jallikattu support team who had interacted with the Government of Tamilnadu regarding 2017 pro-jallikattu protests.

Early life 
Soundararaja was born in Usilampatti, Madurai District he finished schooling and college in his native place, then he moved to Chennai. According to Soundararaja, like Vijay Sethupathi, he was a below-average student right from school and was interested in neither sports nor extra-curricular activities, but did a lot of show-off.

He did a series of odd jobs for pocket money: Salesman at a retail store, promoter and many part-time jobs in Chennai. He graduated with a B.E degree from Bharth Niketan Engineering College affiliated to Madurai Kamaraj University in 2004. He joined as a project engineer in Invensys India Pvt Ltd, deputed to Singapore in 2005 after 2006 he moved Technip France US-based company from there he deputed to Qatar in 2007.

He returned to India in 2008. After he started a new film production company called Madurai Touring Talkies with his childhood friend M. Manikandan director of Kaaka Muttai and also he invested some money in share market business with friends, he joined the Koothu-P-Pattarai acting drama school in 2010. He and his friends Manikandan and Karthik Subbaraj, director of Jigarthanda produced many short films under his banners (Madurai Touring Talkies) –  Thuru, Raavanm, Petticase, Wind, Aram, etc. with his friends' support.

Film career

He subsequently joined the Chennai-based theatre group Koothu-P-Pattarai as an accountant and actor where he observed actors. He made his beginnings as a background actor, particularly playing the role of the lead character's friend in a few films, including the well-known series Penn that began in August 2008, as well as several short films as part of the television show Nalaya Iyakunar for Kalaignar TV. He worked on many short films with M. Manikandan and Karthik Subbaraj, who later cast him in his first feature film.

Soundararaja accompanied who went to director Lingusamy's studio to audition for his film Vettai (2011) and was selected to play Arya's friend in the film. Following Vettai, and he worked Pattarai. However, the film did not see a theatrical. After making an appearance in S. R. Prabhakaran's Sundarapandian (2012), he was cast by director Ponram in minor supporting roles in his first project, Varuthapadatha Valibar Sangam  (2013). Soundararaja would later credit S. R. Prabhakaran with having had an "important role in helping him realise his dreams". S. R. Prabhakaran, furthermore, guided Soundararaja to many tips. Then director Karthik Subbaraj got him his second negative role in Jigarthanda (2013), in which he portrayed a shepherd. After Jigarthanda'''s release, with actor Vishal and actor Siddarth, Soundararaja performed in Poojai. After Jigarthanda he got a chance to work in director Bharathan's Athithi'' (2014).

Filmography

Short film project
 Thuru (2010)
 Ravanam (2010)
 Petticase (2010)
 Wind (2011)
 Aram (2012)

References

1983 births
Living people
People from Madurai district
Indian male film actors
Male actors in Tamil cinema